Judith McGrath (21 April 1947 – 20 October 2017) was an Australian actress.

Biography 

McGrath was known for her television roles, including soap operas Prisoner (1979–84), as Deputy Governor/Officer Colleen "Poface" Powell, A Country Practice (1992–93) as hippy Bernice Hudson and for her Logie Award-nominated role in the medical drama All Saints as Nurse Yvonne "Von" Ryan (1998–2009) and her comedy roles in children's series Round the Twist as Matron Cecilia Gribble.

McGrath was known for playing characters with a dry, often sarcastic wit.

Early life
Born in Brisbane, McGrath began her career at the Brisbane Arts Theatre, and was a member of Twelfth Night Theatre under artistic director Joan Whalley. She also played Grace in the 1969 film Age of Consent.

Career
McGrath is probably best known to international audiences for her role in the cult Network Ten series Prisoner as fair-minded but sarcastic Deputy Governor Colleen" Poface" Powell. Initially a minor character, appearing in 12 episodes in the first two series (1979–80), she became a permanent cast member in 1981 and went on to appear in a total of 263 episodes. She chose to leave the series, taping her final scenes in December 1983. Her farewell episode aired in May 1984 during the show's sixth season. 

After leaving Prisoner, McGrath appeared in guest roles in Neighbours in 1985 and The Flying Doctors in 1986 and 1988, before appearing in the first series of the children's television show Round The Twist in 1989, playing Matron Gribble. She went on to be a regular cast member on A Country Practice as Bernice Hudson from 1992 until 1993.

McGrath played the long-running role of Yvonne "Von"' Ryan in television medical drama series All Saints on Network Seven from its debut in 1998, opposite co-star Georgie Parker. She was the only original cast member to stay with the series until it concluded in late 2009.

Death
McGrath died in Brisbane at the age of 70 on 20 October 2017.

Filmography

FILM

TELEVISION

References

External links

1947 births
2017 deaths
Actresses from Brisbane
20th-century Australian actresses
21st-century Australian actresses
Australian film actresses
Australian soap opera actresses
Australian stage actresses